Little Flower School, Mudinepalli is the first English medium school in Krishna District and East & West Godavari district, Andhra Pradesh, India. It was established in 1968 at Mudinepalli. Balusu Sri Satya Siva Prasad Rao has founded the school with the motto to provide high quality education to children from villages.

Academics 
Little Flower School is a day cum boarding school. English is the medium of instruction.

Extra-curricular activities

Competitions 
Little Flower School students has won prizes at national, state and district level competitions. Competitions include Bhagavad Gita sloka recital contest, Science and Math talent test, Karate Competitions
 and many other talent tests.

References 

High schools and secondary schools in Andhra Pradesh
Schools in Krishna district
Educational institutions established in 1968
1968 establishments in Andhra Pradesh
Christian schools in Andhra Pradesh